Chico Silva may refer to:

 Chico Silva (footballer, born 1967), Portuguese football player
 Chico Silva (footballer, born 1978), Portuguese football player